Harold Henry Horsenail (18 January 1892 – 7 December 1969) was an Australian rules footballer who played with St Kilda in the Victorian Football League (VFL).

Notes

External links 

1892 births
1969 deaths
Australian rules footballers from Victoria (Australia)
St Kilda Football Club players